Te Peehi Turoa (? – 8 September 1845) was a notable New Zealand tribal leader, warrior and composer of waiata. Of Māori descent, he identified with the Te Ati Haunui-a-Paparangi iwi.  Topia Peehi Turoa was his grandson.

References

1845 deaths
New Zealand singer-songwriters
Te Āti Haunui-a-Pāpārangi people
Signatories of the Treaty of Waitangi
New Zealand military personnel
Year of birth missing